Devu G. versus State Of Kerala   (2023) is the case where Supreme Court granted special leave to appeal for a queer petitioner who received an unfavourable ruling in a High Court. The petitioners appealed the order of the Kerala High Court that directed a queer woman detained by her parents, against her wishes, to attend counselling sessions. The Supreme Court stayed the order on 6 February 2023.

Background 
The parents of a queer woman attempted to separate her from her same-sex partner by detaining her. As a result, the detainee's partner filed a petition seeking a writ of habeas corpus.

Trial at Kerala High Court 
The case was heard by a two-bench judge consisting of Judge Alexander Thomas and C.S. Sudha. On 2 February 2023, the Court passed an interim order directing the queer detainee to attend counselling sessions in an authorized counselling centre. Following the order, the petitioner appealed to the Supreme Court.

Special Leave to Appeal to Supreme Court 
A three-judge bench consisting of Chief Justice of India DY Chandrachud and Justices PS Narasimha and JB Pardiwala agreed to hear the appeal. The Court heard the matter on 6 February 2023. The Court ordered a stay on further proceedings before the Kerala High Court until 17th February 2023, when the Special Leave Petition will be heard.

Significance 
The case is the first instance of the Supreme Court agreeing to hear a Special Leave Petition from a queer petitioner who received an unfavourable ruling in a High Court. Special Leave Petitions has been provided as a residual power in the hands of Supreme Court to be exercised only in cases when any substantial question of law is involved, or gross injustice has been done. The aggrieved party cannot claim special leave to appeal as a right, but it is privilege vested in the Supreme Court of India to grant leave to appeal or not.

See also 

 LGBT rights in India
 Adhila Nasarin v. State Commissioner of Police (2022)
 S Sushma v. Commissioner of Police (2021)
 Ujjawal v. State of Haryana (2021)

References 

LGBT rights in India
Indian LGBT rights case law
2023 in case law
2023 in India
2023 in LGBT history
Conversion therapy
High Courts of India cases
Kerala High Court
Supreme Court of India cases
Supreme Court of India